Kaposfüred (officially Kaposvár-Kaposfüred) is located on the north side of Kaposvár. Before 1970, it was an independent village.

History

The first written documents of the existence of the city are from 1192, when Béla III of Hungary staked out the borders of Kaposvár. In those times, it was the lordship of the abbey of Somogyvár, founded by László I of Hungary. In 1390 it was mentioned by the name of Fired, then, and in 1439 it was called Fyred in royal documents. For few years, it was owned by Bálint Török, in the 16th century.

Sport

Kapsfüred has an ex-third-division club, Kaposfüred SC, which is currently playing in Somogy county's 3rd league.

External links

History of Somogy
Kaposvár
Former municipalities of Hungary